The M18 is a motorway in Yorkshire, England. A section of the road forms part of the unsigned Euroroute E13.

Route
The M18 runs in a northeast–southwest direction from junction 32 of the M1 motorway to junction 35 of the M62 motorway.  It passes east of Rotherham, southeast of Doncaster and Armthorpe, and west of Thorne. It meets the A1(M) at junction 2 (A1(M) junction 35)--known as the Wadworth Interchange—and the M180 motorway at junction 5. Access to Doncaster is provided from junctions 3 (A6182) and 4 (A630)

The middle half of the M18 is a two-lane dual carriageway, and carries relatively low volumes of traffic. However, the M1 to A1(M) section and M180 to M62 section are much busier, with three lanes in each direction, and there is a small three-lane section northbound between junctions 2 and 3. It passes over the Wadworth Viaduct at junction 2. To the north it then crosses the East Coast Main Line, and until its closure and the dismantling of the pit head gear, a large colliery could be seen to the south at Rossington.

History
 Junction 1 to junction 2 opened in 1967
 Junction 5 to junction 6 opened in 1972
 Junction 6 to junction 7 opened in 1975
 Junction 4 to junction 5 opened in 1977
 Junction 2 to junction 4 opened in 1979

The M18 was originally to be part of the M1, but it was decided to route the M1 towards Leeds instead of Doncaster, and the routing of what would have been the M1 east of Sheffield became the M18. 
To provide better access to Doncaster town centre and the new Great Yorkshire Way to Doncaster Sheffield Airport, the section of the M18 between junctions 2 and 3 northbound was upgraded to three lanes, between  June 2014 and June 2015.

Junctions

Data from driver location signs are used to provide distance and carriageway identifier information.  The location sequence is a continuation of the M1 location sequence.

{| style="margin-left:1em; margin-bottom:1em; color:black; font-size:95%;" class="wikitable"
|-  style="background:#0080d0; text-align:center; color:white; font-size:120%;"
| colspan="6" | M18 motorway junctions
|-
!scope=col|miles
!scope=col|km
!scope=col abbr="Southbound"|Southbound exits (B carriageway)
!scope=col|Junction
!scope=col abbr="Northbound"|Northbound exits (A carriageway)
!scope=col|Coordinates
|- align="center"
|156.8
|252.4
| The SOUTH, London, NottinghamSheffield, Leeds M1
| M1, J32
| Start of motorway
| 
|- style="text-align:center;"
|158.5
|255.1
| Rotherham A631
| J1
| Rotherham A631
| 
|- style="text-align:center;"
|163.8
|263.6
| Newark, Leeds A1(M)
| J2
| The NORTH, The SOUTH A1(M)
| 
|- style="text-align:center;"
|165.9
|267.1
| Doncaster A6182
| J3
| Doncaster A6182Doncaster Sheffield 
| 
|- style="text-align:center;"
|171.8
|276.5
| Doncaster A630
| J4
| Doncaster A630
| 
|- style="text-align:center;"
|175.8
|283.0
| Scunthorpe, Grimsby, Doncaster Sheffield , Humberside  M180Doncaster North services
| J5Services
| Scunthorpe, Grimsby, Doncaster Sheffield , Humberside  M180 Doncaster North Services
| 
|- style="text-align:center;"
|177.8
|286.2
| Thorne A614
| J6
| Thorne A614
| 
|- style="text-align:center;"
|
|
| style=background:skyblue | Entering South Yorkshire
|
| style=background:skyblue | Entering East Riding of Yorkshire
| 
|- style="text-align:center;"
|182.7
|294.0
| Start of motorway
| J7
| The NORTH (A1(M)), LeedsHull, York, Goole M62
| 
|-
|colspan=6|Notes
 Distances in kilometres and carriageway identifiers are obtained from driver location signs/location marker posts. Where a junction spans several hundred metres and the data is available, both the start and finish values for the junction are shown.
 Coordinate data from ACME Mapper.
|-

See also
 List of motorways in the United Kingdom

References

External links

 CBRD Motorway Database – M18
 Hotels and restaurants along the motorway.
 Motorway Archive – M1 to A1(M)
 Motorway Archive – A1(M) to M62

Motorways in England
Roads in Yorkshire
Roads in Doncaster